This article is about the particular significance of the year 1715 to Wales and its people.

Incumbents
Lord Lieutenant of North Wales (Lord Lieutenant of Anglesey, Caernarvonshire, Denbighshire, Flintshire, Merionethshire, Montgomeryshire) – Hugh Cholmondeley, 1st Earl of Cholmondeley 
Lord Lieutenant of South Wales (Lord Lieutenant of Glamorgan, Brecknockshire, Cardiganshire, Carmarthenshire, Monmouthshire, Pembrokeshire, Radnorshire) – Thomas Herbert, 8th Earl of Pembroke (until 14 October); after this date, Lord Lieutenants are appointed for each individual county.

Bishop of Bangor – John Evans
Bishop of Llandaff – John Tyler
Bishop of St Asaph – John Wynne
Bishop of St Davids – Adam Ottley

Events
6 February - John Wynne is enthroned as Bishop of St Asaph.
9 February - An advertisement appears in the London Gazette for the first St David's Day dinner in London, to be followed by a sermon given by Rev George Lewis.
1 March - The Society of Antient Britons is founded in London. Thomas Jones, its first treasurer and secretary, presents the society's "loyal address" to King George I and is subsequently knighted.
March - Owen Meyrick, a Whig, challenges the supremacy of the Tory Bulkeley family in Anglesey by being elected to Parliament for the constituency.
September - William Herbert, 2nd Marquess of Powis, is among those arrested in connection with the first Jacobite Rebellion.
9 November - Silvanus Bevan marries Elizabeth, daughter of royal clockmaker Daniel Quare.

Arts and literature

New books
John Roderick - Welsh almanack (first in the series)

Births
7 March (in Massachusetts) - Ephraim Williams, American landowner and slave owner of Welsh descent, founder of Williams College (died 1755)

Deaths
1 January - John Morgan, lord of the manor and lordship of Gwynllwg, merchant and MP for Monmouth Boroughs, 74?
16 January - Robert Nelson, philanthropist and non-juror, 58
29 June - Richard Lucas, clergyman and author, 66?
29 October - John Barlow, MP for Pembrokeshire, 57?
19 December - Robert Jones, MP for Glamorganshire, 33

See also
1715 in Scotland

References

1710s in Wales
Years of the 18th century in Wales